Willie Lee Jenkins was lynched in Eufaula, Barbour County, Alabama. According to the United States Senate Committee on the Judiciary it was the 3rd of 61 lynchings during 1922 in the United States.

Background
According to his grand daughter Shirley Johnson, her grandfather had a dispute with his boss' wife which cost him his life. Newspapers of the time reported that he "insulted a white woman."

Lynching 

He tried to escape by train but a mob dragged him off, took him into the woods and killed him. His corpse was found in the bottom of a well in Barbour County,  from Eufaula on the Batesville road.

Bibliography 
Notes

References 

1922 riots
1922 in Alabama
Deaths by person in Alabama
Lynching deaths in Alabama 
February 1922 events
Protest-related deaths
Racially motivated violence against African Americans 
Riots and civil disorder in Alabama 
White American riots in the United States